Legislative Assembly elections were held in the Indian state of Rajasthan on 1 December 2013. Results were announced on 8 December. The incumbent ruling party Indian National Congress, led by the Chief Minister Ashok Gehlot, lost the elections to Vasundhara Raje-led BJP, who was being touted as the next incumbent.

Pre-poll surveys

Election
Polling was held on 1 December in 199 assembly seats out of 200 seats. Churu constituency polling was postponed to 13 December due to death of BSP candidate Jagdish Meghwal.

Voter-verified paper audit trail (VVPAT) along with EVMs was used in 1 assembly seat in Rajasthan elections. There were 2,087 candidates including 166 women and one eunuch candidate. INC and BJP contested on all 200 seats while BSP on 195 seats. 38 CPI(M), 23 CPI, 16 NCP, 666 other parties candidates and 758 Independents were also in foray. Over 4.08 crore voters including 1.92 crore women were eligible to exercise their vote. There were 47,223 polling booths. Total voting turnout was 74.38%, the highest ever in state assembly election. The highest turnout (85.52%) was recorded at Jaisalmer and the lowest (55.21%) at Bharatpur.

Results
The results were declared on 8 December. Chief Minister Ashok Gehlot won from his Sardarpura constituency by a margin of 18,478 votes while Vasundhara Raje won from Jhalarpatan by 60,896 votes. The election also recorded best and worst performances for the BJP and the Congress respectively in the state. Influential Meena leader and MP from Dausa, Kirori Lal Meena received a big setback when his newly formed party, National People's Party won only four seats.

!colspan=10|
|-
! colspan="2" rowspan="2" |Parties and coalitions
! colspan="3" |Popular vote
! colspan="4" |Seats
|-
! Votes !! % !! ±pp!!Contested!! Won !! +/− || %
|-style="text-align:right"
| 
| style="text-align:left;" |Bharatiya Janata Party (BJP)||13,939,203
|45.2||10.9
|200|| 163 || 85 || 81.5 
|-style="text-align:right"
| 
| style="text-align:left;" |Indian National Congress (INC)||10,204,694
|33.1|| 3.7
|200|| 21 || 75 || 10.5 
|-style="text-align:right"
| 
| style="text-align:left;" |Independents (IND)||2,533,224
|8.2|| 6.8
|758|| 7 || 7 || 3.5 
|-style="text-align:right"
| 
| style="text-align:left;" |National People's Party (NPP)||1,312,402
|4.3||4.3
|134|| 4 || 4 || 2.0 
|-style="text-align:right"
| 
| style="text-align:left;" |Bahujan Samaj Party (BSP)||1,041,241
|3.4|| 4.2
|195|| 3 || 3 || 1.5 
|-style="text-align:right"
| 
| style="text-align:left;" |National Unionist Zamindara Party (NUZP)|| 312,653
|1.0||1.0
|25|| 2 || 2 || 1.0 
|-style="text-align:right"
| 
| style="text-align:left;" |Communist Party of India (Marxist) (CPM)
|269,002
|0.9
|0.7
|38
|0
|3
|0.0
|-style="text-align:right"
| 
| style="text-align:left;" |Samajwadi Party (SP)
|118,911
|0.4
|0.4
|56
|0
|1
|0.0
|-style="text-align:right"
| 
| style="text-align:left;" |Janata Dal (United) (JD(U))
|59,673
|0.2
|0.3
|15
|0
|1
|0.0
|-style="text-align:right"
| style="text-align:left;" colspan="2" |Other parties and candidates
|479,700
|1.4
|2.0
|573
|0
|1
|0.0
|-style="text-align:right"
| style="text-align:left;" colspan="2" |None of the Above (NOTA)
|589,923
|1.9
|1.9
| colspan="4" style="background-color:#E9E9E9" |
|-
|- class="unsortable" style="background-color:#E9E9E9"
! colspan="9" |
|-style="text-align:right"
| colspan="2" style="text-align:left; " |Total
|30,860,626
|100.00
| style="background-color:#E9E9E9" |
|2194
|200
|±0
|100.0
|-
! colspan="9" |
|-style="text-align:right"
| colspan="2" style="text-align:left; " |Valid votes
|30,860,626
|99.89
|
| colspan="4" rowspan="5" style="background-color:#E9E9E9" |
|-style="text-align:right"
| colspan="2" style="text-align:left; " |Invalid votes
|35,113
|0.11
|
|-style="text-align:right"
| colspan="2" style="text-align:left; " |Votes cast / turnout
|30,895,739
|75.67
|
|-style="text-align:right"
| colspan="2" style="text-align:left; " |Abstentions
|9,933,573
|24.33
|
|-style="text-align:right"
| colspan="2" style="text-align:left; " |Registered voters
|40,829,312
| colspan="2" style="background-color:#E9E9E9" |
|-
! colspan="9" |
|-
| colspan="9" style="text-align:left; " |Source: Election Commission of India
|}

Region-wise Results

Members of Legislative Assembly
List of members of Rajasthan Assembly after the 2013 elections results were declared.

See also

 2013 elections in India

References

External links
Rajasthan assembly elections on India elections 2014

2013 State Assembly elections in India
2013
2013
December 2013 events in India